MFW may refer to:

 M&F Worldwide, traded on the NYSE using the code MFW
 Märkische-Flugzeugwerke (MFW), a German aircraft manufacturer of World War One, see Rumpler C.I
 Miami–Fort Lauderdale–West Palm Beach metropolitan area
 Milan Fashion Week
 "My Face When", in SMS language